Carex appropinquata, known as fibrous tussock-sedge, is a species of flowering plant in the family Cyperaceae, commonly known as sedges.

References 

 GBIF entry
 Encyclopedia of Life entry

appropinquata
Flora of Europe
Flora of Asia
Plants described in 1801